Natalia Yevgenievna Mishkutionok (born 14 July 1970) is a Belarusian former pair skater. With Artur Dmitriev, she is the 1992 Olympic champion, the 1994 Olympic silver medalist, a two-time World champion (1991, 1992), and a two-time European champion (1991, 1992).

Personal life
Natalia Mishkutionok was born on 14 July 1970 to a Polish mother and a Belarusian father in the Byelorussian SSR. In 1995, she settled in Colorado Springs, Colorado and moved to Texas in 2001. She was formerly married to American hockey player Craig Shepherd, with whom she skated professionally on occasion during the late 1990s. She divorced Shepherd and married Alan Hainline. Their daughter, Natasha Alena Mishkutionok-Hainline, was born on 16 January 2006.

Career 
Mishkutionok began skating in 1976. She teamed up with Artur Dmitriev around 1986. They were coached by Tamara Moskvina in Saint Petersburg and their choreographers were Alexander Matveev with Moskvina. Together, Mishkutionok/Dmitriev won the 1991 and 1992 World and European Championships, and Olympic gold in 1992. They performed to Franz Liszt's Liebesträume (Dream of Love), which became one of the most noted programs of their career and earned them four perfect 6.0 marks at the 1992 World Championships in Oakland, California. They turned professional shortly after that championship.

Mishkutionok/Dmitriev chose to reinstate as amateurs after the ban against such actions was lifted. They attempted to defend their Olympic title in the 1994 Winter Olympics, where they delivered two strong programs. Their free skate to Rachmaninov's 2nd Piano Concerto earned a standing ovation and is considered one of their finest performances. The judges awarded the gold medal to Mishkutionok and Dmitriev's friends and countrymen Ekaterina Gordeeva / Sergei Grinkov ("G & G"). Mishkutionok decided to retire from competition in 1994.

One hallmark of Mishkutionok/Dmitriev's style was her flexibility and their creative spins, especially one in which Mishkutionok would do a split and point her head down, with an arm around Dmitriev's calf so that they were both vertical and aligned; this signature move, called "Natasha's spin" was incorporated into most of their programs. Another signature move was a backwards inside death spiral in which Mishkutionok bent backwards, holding her foot behind and above her head while Dmitriev also held her raised skate blade and her free hand. Mishkutionok/Dmitriev competed before, during, and after the breakup of the Soviet Union, thus, they competed for the Soviet Union, the Unified Team, and Russia, all within a four-year period.

Mishkutionok is currently coaching pairs and singles skaters in Grapevine, Texas and Farmers Branch, Texas. One of her students is the U.S. men's 2009 novice silver medalist Stevan Evans.

Programs

Competitive highlights 
(with Artur Dmitriev)

Professional

References

Navigation 

Russian female pair skaters
Soviet female pair skaters
Olympic gold medalists for the Unified Team
Olympic silver medalists for Russia
Olympic figure skaters of the Unified Team
Olympic figure skaters of Russia
Figure skaters at the 1992 Winter Olympics
Figure skaters at the 1994 Winter Olympics
American people of Belarusian descent
American people of Polish descent
Russian emigrants to the United States
Living people
1970 births
Figure skaters from Minsk
Russian people of Belarusian descent
Russian people of Polish descent
Olympic medalists in figure skating
World Figure Skating Championships medalists
European Figure Skating Championships medalists
Medalists at the 1992 Winter Olympics
Medalists at the 1994 Winter Olympics
People from Grapevine, Texas
Universiade medalists in figure skating
Goodwill Games medalists in figure skating
Universiade gold medalists for the Soviet Union
Competitors at the 1989 Winter Universiade
Competitors at the 1990 Goodwill Games
Competitors at the 1994 Goodwill Games